Esas is a village in Iran.

ESAS may refer to:

 Easy Star All-Stars, an American/Jamaican reggae collective
 Edmonton Symptom Assessment System
 European Society of Aesthetic Surgery
 Exploration Systems Architecture Study
 European Scandinavian Airlines System; see History of Scandinavian Airlines System (pre-1952)
 East Siberia Arctic Shelf

See also 
 ESA (disambiguation)